Veaceslav Lisa (born 24 May 1993) is a Moldovan football midfielder who plays for FC Speranta Drochia.

Honours
 Moldovan National Division: 2011–12, 2012–13 2013–14
 Moldovan Super Cup: 2013

External links

1993 births
Living people
Moldovan footballers
FC Sheriff Tiraspol players
FC Saxan players
FC Academia Chișinău players
FC Ungheni players
FC Sfîntul Gheorghe players
FC Spicul Chișcăreni players
Moldovan Super Liga players
Association football midfielders
Moldova youth international footballers
Moldova under-21 international footballers